Marco Ciccioli (born 6 November 1995) is an Argentine rugby union player, currently playing for Italian United Rugby Championship side Rovigo Delta. His preferred position is Prop.

In March 2019 Ciccioli a short contract with Italian Pro14 team Zebre.

In 2018 and 2019, Ciccioli was named in the Argentina XV squad.

References

External links
itsrugby.co.uk Profile

Living people
Argentine rugby union players
Zebre Parma players
Rugby Rovigo Delta players
Rugby union props
1995 births
Sportspeople from Bahía Blanca